Five ships and a shore establishment of the Royal Navy have borne the name HMS Osprey, after the bird of prey the Osprey:

Ships
 was an 18-gun  launched in 1797 and broken up in 1813.
 was a 12-gun brig launched in 1844 and wrecked in 1846.
 was a  wooden screw gunvessel launched in 1856 and wrecked in 1867.
 was an  composite screw sloop launched in 1876 and sold in 1890.
 was a  launched in 1897 and sold in 1919.

Shore establishments
 HMS Osprey, Portland was an anti-submarine training establishment established at Portland between 1924 and 1941, when its functions were transferred to Dunoon. HMS Osprey was at Dunoon until 1946, the name also being allocated to a smaller base established at Belfast in 1943. Osprey recommissioned at Portland in 1946, became a base in 1948 and was closed in 1995.
 RNAS Portland (HMS Osprey) was an air station of the Royal Navy, situated at Portland, established in 1917. From 1959 the station shared the name HMS Osprey with the anti-submarine shore-based establishment located at East Weares, which used the air station's helicopters for research and development in anti-submarine techniques. It closed in 1999.

Royal Navy ship names